Cloisonnism is a style of post-Impressionist painting with bold and flat forms separated by dark contours. The term was coined by critic Édouard Dujardin on the occasion of the Salon des Indépendants, in March 1888. Artists Émile Bernard, Louis Anquetin, Paul Gauguin, Paul Sérusier, and others started painting in this style in the late 19th century. The name evokes the technique of cloisonné, where wires (cloisons or "compartments") are soldered to the body of the piece, filled with powdered glass, and then fired. Many of the same painters also described their works as Synthetism, a closely related movement.

In The Yellow Christ (1889), often cited as a quintessential cloisonnist work, Gauguin reduced the image to areas of single colors separated by heavy black outlines. In such works he paid little attention to classical perspective and eliminated subtle gradations of color—two of the most characteristic principles of post-Renaissance painting.

The cloisonnist separation of colors reflects an appreciation for discontinuity that is characteristic of Modernism.

Gallery

Resources

Notes

See also
Émile Bernard chronology
The Volpini Exhibition, 1889

External links 
 Cloisonnism at ArtFacts

Post-Impressionism
Artistic techniques
Modern art